Nipgen is an unincorporated community in Ross County, in the U.S. state of Ohio.

History
The community has the name of John A. Nipgen, an area resident. A post office called Nipgen was established in 1887, and remained in operation until 1906. Besides the post office, Nipgen had a country store.

References

Unincorporated communities in Ross County, Ohio
Unincorporated communities in Ohio
1887 establishments in Ohio
Populated places established in 1887